Bruce French (born July 4, 1945) is an American actor who has been acting for more than 30 years.

French was born in Reinbeck, Iowa. He attended the University of Iowa and majored in speech and theatre. He is married to actress/singer Eileen Barnett.

Career 
He is noted for his recurring role as Father Lonigan on the NBC daytime drama Passions.

He also played Jim Burns the wealthy neighbor of the Malloy/"Rich" family on The Riches; Jim's wife, Nina, is played by Margo Martindale.

His movie roles include that of a checkout man in Frank Perry's Man on a Swing.

Awards and nominations
Ovation Awards
2010: Won the award for Lead Actor in a Play for the role of Andrew Crocker-Harris in the Pacific Resident Theatre production of "The Browning Version"

Filmography

Man on a Swing (1974) .... Check-Out Man
Pipe Dreams (1976) .... The Duke
Rollercoaster (1977) .... Bomb Squad #2
Coming Home (1978) .... Dr. Lincoln
Bloodbrothers (1978) .... Paulie
First Family (1980) .... White House Tour Guide
Airplane II: The Sequel (1982) .... Officer #2
Mr. Mom (1983) .... Douglass
Sweetwater (1983) .... Driver
Christine (1983) .... Mr. Smith
Fletch (1985) .... Dr. Holmes
Jagged Edge (1985) .... Richard Duffin
Murphy's Romance (1985) .... Rex Boyd
Wildcats (1986) .... Mayhew
Legal Eagles (1986) .... Reporter
Surrender (1987) .... Dream Lawyer
Black Eagle (1988) .... Father Joseph Bedelia
Martians Go Home (1989) .... Elgins
Star Trek: Insurrection (1998) .... Son'a Officer #1
Jurassic Park III (2001) .... Science Reporter
Sorority Boys (2002) .... Dean Blevins
The West Wing (2002) .... Bill Stark
Enough (2002) .... Homeowner
Mr. Deeds (2002) .... Helicopter Pilot
Sexual Life (2004) .... Priest
Thank You for Smoking (2005) .... Gentleman #2
Mission: Impossible III (2006) .... Minister
Dark and Stormy Night (2009) .... Jeens
Beginners (2010) .... Dr. Wright
Beautiful Boy (2010) .... Harry

References

External links
 

People from Grundy County, Iowa
American male television actors
20th-century American male actors
21st-century American male actors
1945 births
Living people
Male actors from Iowa